Michael Smith was an English cricketer. He was a right-handed batsman and wicket-keeper who played for Oxfordshire.

Having represented Oxfordshire in the Minor Counties Championship since 1959, Smith made a single List A appearance for the side, during the 1967 season, against Cambridgeshire. From the lower order, he scored 12 runs.

External links
Michael Smith at CricketArchive 

English cricketers
Oxfordshire cricketers